Felix Bast (born Vadakke Madam Sreejith Nambissan, വടക്കേ മാഡം ശ്രീജിത്ത് നമ്പീശൻ) is an Indian phycologist, author and public educator based at the Central University of Punjab. He has discovered seven new species of plants from India and Antarctica.

Early life and education
Felix Bast was born in Payyannur, Kerala, India, as Vadakke Madam Sreejith Nambissan, to a Malayali Brahmin Nambissan family. He attended government Boys' High School in Payyannur. Subsequently, he completed BSc in Microbiology from Kannur University with the university first rank and MSc in Biotechnology with First Class from the University of Madras Guindy Campus. Bast was associated with the Department of Chemical Engineering, Indian Institute of Technology, Bombay as a PhD student and CSIR-JRF. In 2005 he left IIT Bombay to accept the Japanese Government Doctoral Scholarship (MEXT) and completed PhD in Marine Biology from Kochi University, Shikoku, Japan. Other institutes where he took training include Friday Harbor Laboratories (University of Washington, USA) and Marine Biological Association of UK laboratories, Plymouth, UK.

Career and research 
Bast is a professor at the Central University of Punjab, India. He also served as expedition scientist for Indian Antarctic Mission 2016-17 and conducted research at Bharati Station and Maitri Station, Antarctica. Bast authored popular science book Voyage to Antarctica detailing his experiences as part of the Indian Antarctic Mission. He served as a guest scientist at Leibniz Centre for Tropical Marine Research, Bremen, Germany in 2018-19. Bast is a renowned algal taxonomist having discovered several new species from India and Antarctica. Species that he and his research team discovered include:

 Acetabularia jalakanyakae (Dasycladales): A unicellular marine green algae from Andaman & Nicobar Islands, India
 Bryum bharatiense (Bryaceae): A moss species from East Antarctica that survive on penguin excrements
 Hypnea indica (Hypneaceae): A marine red alga from Tamil Nadu, India
 Hypnea bullata (Hypneaceae): A marine red alga from Gujarat, India
 Ulva paschima (Ulvaceae): A marine green alga from Indian West Coast
 Ulva uniseriata (Ulvaceae): A marine green alga from West Bengal, India
 Cladophora goensis (Cladophorales): A marine green alga from Goa, India

In addition, he is the taxonomic authority of Monostroma kuroshiense, one of the extensively cultivated edible green algae in the Kuroshio coasts of southern Japan.

Other activities
 He founded Young Academy of India and its nation-wide ideological matchmaking program MentX
 He is a known Science Communicator in India, with frequent contributions in Resonance, Science Reporter, The Hindu and so on

Recognition
Bast is an elected fellow of the Linnean Society of London, the most prestigious society for taxonomists in the world. Bast is a member and expert panellist of the International Science Council, Paris- an apex body of science academies in the world.   In 2022, he has become an expert member of International Union for Conservation of Nature. He served as in-residence intern with the President of India at Rashtrapati Bhawan, New Delhi in 2015 as part of Inspired Teacher program. Other recognitions include:
Teaching Innovator Award from Ministry of Education, Government of India in 2019
DST Inspire Faculty Award from Department of Science and Technology, Government of India
NAM-Leibniz Guest scientist award 2018 to do sabbatical at Leibniz Centre for Tropical Marine Research, Bremen
and Elected as national core committee representative of Indian National Young Academy of Sciences, New Delhi (2020)

References

1980 births
Living people
Kochi University alumni
Indian expatriates in Japan
University of Madras alumni
21st-century Indian botanists
Scientists from Kerala
People from Kannur district